Éric Caire (born May 21, 1965) is a Canadian politician from Quebec, Canada, and the CAQ Member of the National Assembly for the electoral district of La Peltrie.

Early career 
Caire was born in Sorel-Tracy, Quebec. He was the owner of a local business for one year and taught computer science at Collège François-Xavier-Garneau in Quebec City. Before his election, he was a computer-analyst for eight years including two with Cognicase. In 2004, he was also the host of a local community radio show at CIMI-FM.

Political career 
Caire first attempted to enter politics in 2001 with a failed independent candidacy at the Quebec municipal elections in 2001. Caire first ran for a provincial seat at the National Assembly for the Action démocratique du Québec (ADQ) in the 2003 election but finished second with 34% of the vote.  Liberal candidate France Hamel won with 41% of the vote.

In the 2007 election, Caire was easily elected with 51% of the vote.  Hamel, who was running for re-election, finished second with 27% of the vote. Caire took office on April 12, 2007. On April 19, 2007, he was selected to be the Official Opposition's Shadow Minister of Health.

Caire was among the first ADQ supporters to back the abolition of public school boards, an idea inspired by the OECD reforms on school choice (notably charter schools and school vouchers education models) as they exist notably in England, Sweden, Netherlands, Australia and some Canadian provinces (notably Alberta), that is now part of the party's platform as of 2007.

In the 2008 election, Caire won re-election with 39% of the vote, even though his party's support sharply declined.

He was a candidate for the 2009 Action démocratique du Québec leadership election and lost by two votes to Gilles Taillon. He subsequently left the party, alleging that the party organization lacked transparency and that Taillon had a dictatorial style of leadership.

On December 19, 2011, he joined the CAQ.

Cabinet posts

Footnotes

External links
 
 Facebook Fan Page
 The Case For School Choice, Fraser Institute, 1999 Comparative study on schoolboard-less education systems in OECD countries

1965 births
Action démocratique du Québec MNAs
French Quebecers
Living people
Members of the Executive Council of Quebec
People from Sorel-Tracy
Politicians from Quebec City
Université Laval alumni
Independent MNAs in Quebec
Coalition Avenir Québec MNAs
21st-century Canadian politicians